The DBL proto-oncogene is a protein that in humans is encoded by the MCF2 gene.

The commonly-used name DBL is derived from “diffuse B-cell lymphoma”, the cancer type where this gene was first identified as an oncogene, while the name MCF2 name derives from “MCF.2 cell line-derived transforming sequence”.

DBL is the founding member of a large family of guanine nucleotide exchange factors that share a common DBL-homology (DH) domain), so DBL is also named as a member of this RhoGEF family as ARHGEF21. DH domains function to activate small GTPases of the Rho family by facilitating release of GDP from an inactive Rho GTPase and binding of GTP to activate it. In particular, DBL activates the Rho family member Cdc42.

Gene recombinations that result in the loss of N-terminal regions produce MCF2 variants with oncogenic activity.[supplied by OMIM]

References

Further reading